Françoise Fromonot (born 1958) is a French architect and architectural critic.

Fromonot has taught at the University of Technology Sydney, the University of New South Wales, Rice University in Houston, the École Nationale des Ponts et Chaussée, Science-Po Urba (Paris). She is currently Professor of Design, History and Theory at the École Nationale Supérieure d'Architecture de Paris-Belleville.

From 1994 to 1998, she was editor at Architecture d’Aujourd’hui. From 1999 to 2003, she was co-editor-in-chief for the magazine le visiteur. She was also a founding member for the French architectural journal  in 2007. She has contributed to various French and international publications including AMC, Progressive Architecture, Archis, Abitare, Architectural Review, World Architecture, Arquitectura Viva and Casabella.

Selected Publications 
She has also published several books including:
 Glenn Murcutt, oeuvres et projets (1995)
 Jørn Utzon et l'Opéra de Sydney (1998), received the book prize of the Académie d'architecture
 Sydney, histoire d’un paysage / Sydney, History of a Landscape (with Christopher Thompson), Telleri/Vilo International, Paris, 2000
 Marc Mimram- Passerelle Solférino à Paris, Birkhäuser, Bâle & Berlin, 2001 (bilingual edition french/english)
 Nasrine Seraji-Architecture as Territory (bilingual edition Italian/English), Libria, Melfi, 2002
 Glenn Murcutt–1962-2002, Electa, Milan, 2002. (Gallimard, Paris, 2003 / Thames & Hudson, Londres, 2003), received the book prize of the Académie d'architecture
 La Campagne des Halles - Les nouveaux malheurs de Paris, éditions La Fabrique, Paris, 2005
 Yours critically: Writings on Architecture from criticat issues 1-10 (with Pierre Chabard et Valéry Didelon), criticat, 2016
 La Comédie des Halles - Intrigue et mise en scène, La Fabrique, 2019.
 Michel Desvigne Paysagiste - Territoires en projet / Transforming Landscapes, Birkhäuser, 2020.

References 

1958 births
Living people
French women architects
French women journalists

Chevaliers of the Ordre des Arts et des Lettres